Behnamarab-e Jonubi Rural District is in Javadabad District of Varamin County, Tehran province, Iran. At the National Census of 2006, its population was 15,235 in 3,843 households. There were 13,394 inhabitants in 3,750 households at the following census of 2011. At the most recent census of 2016, the population of the rural district was 13,476 in 4,006 households. The largest of its 92 villages was Mohammadabad-e Arab, with 1,965 people.

References 

Varamin County

Rural Districts of Tehran Province

Populated places in Tehran Province

Populated places in Varamin County